Ludwig Donath (6 March 1900 – 29 September 1967), was an Austrian actor who appeared in many American films.

Life
Born to a Jewish family, Donath graduated from Vienna's Academy of Dramatic Art and became a prominent actor on the stage in Berlin. When Hitler came to power in 1933, he returned to Vienna and was active there in theater and film until the Anschluss in 1938. He began his American film career with Lady from Chungking (1942) and went on to appear in dozens of films, including Gilda (1946), The Jolson Story (1946), Jolson Sings Again (1949), The Great Caruso (1951), My Pal Gus (1952), Sirocco (1951), and  Torn Curtain (1966).

Donath played the father of entertainer Al Jolson (Larry Parks) in the two biopics The Jolson Story (1946) and Jolson Sings Again (1949), although he was less than 15 years older than Parks as Jolson.

He also appeared frequently on television and on Broadway.

He died of leukemia in 1967. His cremains are interred at Ferncliff Cemetery in Hartsdale, New York.

Partial filmography

 Theodor Herzl (1921) – Prinz Eugen
 Girls to Marry (1932) 
 Füsilier Wipf (1938) – Kriegsgefangener (uncredited)
 Enemy Agents Meet Ellery Queen (UK title: The Lido Mystery) (1942) – Reece
 The Secret Code (1942) – Nazi Prof. Metzger
 The Falcon's Brother (1942) – Stranger in Telephone Booth (uncredited)
 Lady from Chungking (1942) – Hans Gruber
 Reunion in France (1942) – Desk Clerk in Hotel (uncredited)
 Margin for Error (1943) – Hitler's Voice
 The Moon Is Down (1943) – Hitler's Voice
 Hangmen Also Die! (1943) – Schirmer 
 Tonight We Raid Calais (1943) – German Sentry 
 Above Suspicion (1943) – Gestapo Officer in Schultz's Laboratory (uncredited)
 This Land Is Mine (1943) – German Captain (uncredited)
 Hostages (1943) – Karel Klima
 The Strange Death of Adolf Hitler (1943) – Adolf Hitler / Franz Huber
 Gangway for Tomorrow (1943) – Polish Worker (uncredited)
 Tampico (1944) – Commander (uncredited)
 The Hitler Gang (1944) – Gustav von Kahr
 The Story of Dr. Wassell (1944) – Dutch Doctor on Train (uncredited)
 The Seventh Cross (1944) – Wilhelm Reinhardt (uncredited)
 The Master Race (1944) – Schmidt 
 Counter-Attack (1945) – Prof. Müller
 Prison Ship (1945) – Professor
 Gilda (1946) – German Cartel Member
 The Devil's Mask (1946) – Dr. Karger
 Renegades (1946) – Jackorski
 The Jolson Story (1946) – Cantor Yoelson
 Blondie Knows Best (1946) – Dr. Titus
 The Return of Monte Cristo (1946) – Judge Lafitte
 Cigarette Girl (1947) – Otto
 To the Ends of the Earth (1948) – Nicholas Sokim
 Sealed Verdict (1948) – Jakob Meyersohn
 The Fighting O'Flynn (1949) – Hendrigg
 The Lovable Cheat (1949) – Violette
 The Great Sinner (1949) – Doctor
 Jolson Sings Again (1949) – Cantor Yoelson
 There's a Girl in My Heart (1949) – Professor Joseph Kroner
 The Killer That Stalked New York (1950) – Dr. Cooper
 Mystery Submarine (1950) – Dr. Adolph Guernitz
 The Great Caruso (1951) – Alfredo Brazzi
 Sirocco (1951) – Flophouse Proprietor
 Journey Into Light (1951) – 'Doc' Thorssen
 My Pal Gus (1952) – Karl
 Sins of Jezebel (1953) – Naboth
 The Veils of Bagdad (1953) – Kaffar
 Torn Curtain (1966) – Professor Gustav Lindt
 The Spy in the Green Hat (1967) – Dr. Heinrich von Kronen
 Too Many Thieves (1967) – Bulanerti

Television appearances
 Decoy: "The Gentle Gun-Man" (1958) - "Knish" (Dave Levine)
 Bonanza: "The Way of Aaron" (1963) – Aaron Kaufman
 The Twilight Zone: "He's Alive" (1963) – Ernst Ganz
 Branded: "A Proud Town" (1965) - Julius Perrin
 The Fugitive: "Blessings of Liberty" (1966) – Dr. Josef Karac

References

External links

 
 
 

1900 births
1967 deaths
Austrian male film actors
Austrian male stage actors
Deaths from cancer in New York (state)
Deaths from leukemia
Austrian male television actors
Jewish Austrian male actors
20th-century Austrian male actors
Austrian expatriate male actors in the United States
Burials at Ferncliff Cemetery